Amenmose, Amenmoses, Amenmesses or Amenmesse was an Egyptian name, found during the Late Bronze Age. Bearers of the name include:

 Amenmesse, the rival Pharaoh to Seti II
 Amenmose (prince), a son of Thutmose I
 Amenmose (TT42), nobleman during the reigns of Thutmose III and Amenhotep II, buried in TT42
 Amenmose (noble), nobleman during the reign of Amenhotep III
 Amenmose, a commissioner, mentioned in the Amarna letters as Amanmašša
 Imenmes (Amenmose), Overseer of the Cattle of Amun, late 18th dynasty
 Amenmose, Son of Pendjerty, a royal scribe from the time of Ramesses II
 Amenmose (Vizier), a vizier dated to the reigns of King Sethi II and Amenmesse

Ancient Egyptian given names
Theophoric names